Operation Bottleneck is a 1961 war film. During the Burma Campaign, a detachment of American paratroopers are aided by a group of local women in their mission against the Japanese.

Six paratroopers undertake an extremely dangerous mission against the Japanese. It will ultimately cost them their lives, except for one "lucky" survivor.

Cast
Ron Foster  ...  Lt. Rulan H. Voss  
Miiko Taka  ...  Ari  
Norman Alden  ...  Cpl. Lester 'Merc' Davenport  
John Clarke  ...  Sgt. Marty Regan  
Ben Wright  ...  Manders 
Dale Ishimoto  ...  Matsu  
Jane Chang  ...  Atsi  
Lemoi Chu  ...  LoLo
Tiko Ling  ...  Tai  
Jin Jin Mai  ...  Sawbu  
June Kawai  ...  Danube
George Yoshinaga  ...  Koju

See also
 List of American films of 1961

References

External links

1961 films
1960s English-language films
American black-and-white films
American war films
1961 war films
United Artists films
Films set in Myanmar
Burma Campaign films
Films directed by Edward L. Cahn
Films produced by Edward Small
1960s American films